State Route 153 (SR 153) is a primary state highway in the U.S. state of Virginia. The state highway runs  from U.S. Route 460 (US 460) near Blackstone north to US 360 near Winterham. SR 153 is the primary north–south highway of eastern Amelia County. The state highway also provides a connection between Blackstone and Richmond in conjunction with US 360.

Route description

SR 153 begins at an intersection with US 460 (Colonial Trail Highway) at the eastern edge of Nottoway County northeast of Blackstone. The state highway heads north as Rocky Hill Road. SR 153 becomes Military Road when entering Amelia County. The state highway then passes through the hamlets of Earls and Wilsons Corner. After crossing Deep Creek, a tributary of the Appomattox River, SR 153 meets the eastern end of SR 38 (Five Forks Road), which heads west to Amelia Court House, at Scotts Fork. The state highway has its northern terminus at US 360 (Patrick Henry Highway) east of Winterham.

Major intersections

References

External links

Virginia Highways Project: VA 153

153
State Route 153
State Route 153